Hello Darling is a 2010 Bollywood comedy film produced by Ashok Ghai and directed by Manoj Tiwari, starring Gul Panag, Isha Koppikar Celina Jaitly and Javed Jaffrey in the lead roles. The film was released on 27 August 2010 under the Mukta Arts Films banner. Sunny Deol makes a special appearance in the movie. The film is an unauthorised adaptation of the American film 9 to 5 (1980).

Plot
Candy (Celina Jaitly) and Mansi (Gul Panag) work in a fashion designer firm. Satvari Chaudary (Isha Koppikar) joins their firm for a job. Candy and Mansi inform Satvari of their flirtatious boss, Hardhik Vasu (Javed Jaffrey) whose desire is to sleep with hot women. Everyone in the firm knows that Mansi always prepares coffee for Hardhik. One day, Mansi, who is fed up with Hardhik stealing her work, accidentally mixes Rat Kill in his coffee. As Hardhik is about to sip his coffee, he falls off his chair. (But it creates the impression that he died from the poison).

Fearful of getting caught, the three girls (Candy, Mansi and Satvari) head to the hospital to make things right. Due to a misunderstanding, the three girls think he's dead. (Coincidentally, another patient died, which they think is Hardhik)  Mansi and Satvari hide his "body" in the back of their taxi but soon they realize it's the wrong body. The next day at work, the three girls find out Hardhik is still alive, who also recorded the girls taking out a dead body from hospital. Hardhik offers the girls to avoid jail on one condition - they must accompany Hardhik to Kandala for 7 days. The day before leaving, the girls contact Hardhik under the pretext of sleeping with him. After a bit of song and dance, they make him unconscious by dousing a cloth with methylated spirits and placing it on his face.

Meanwhile, Hardhik's wife (Divya Dutta) finds out he had an affair with Candy. To reform him, she calls Poolan Bhai (Seema Biswas), who runs a place to reform men of their flirtatious deeds. Due to a misunderstanding, they think her husband is Rocky (Chunkey Pandey), who is Candy's boyfriend. Hardhik manages to escape from the house (the girls chained him that night he was unconscious). The girls then contemplate whether to contact Nikhi Bajaj (Sunny Deol), the manager of the firm. He reaches there and disapproves Hardhik's contact for renewal and sends him to Bangladesh. Nikhil appoints Mansi as vice-president and encourages her to marry her fiancé, Ashish (Anil Mange). Nikhil himself ends up falling in love with Satvari whereas Candy is reunited with Rocky. The film ends in Bangladesh where Hardhik realizes his boss is gay.

Cast
Sunny Deol (special appearance)
Chunkey Pandey as Rocky
Javed Jaffrey as Hardhik Vasu
Isha Koppikar as Satvari Chaudary
Celina Jaitly as Candy D'Souza, Rocky's girlfriend
Gul Panag as Mansi Joshi
Divya Dutta as Hardhik's wife
Mukesh Tiwari as Inspector Eagle
Sanjay Mishra as "Dead" Patient
Vrajesh Hirjee as Thief
Meghna Patel as Hardhik's assistant
Anil Mange as Ashish (Mansi's fiancé)
Seema Biswas as Poolan Bhai
Vivek Shauq as Ajay 
Rajesh Khattar Hardhik's new boss
Kurush Deboo as Rustomjee

Soundtrack

The soundtrack was launched on 27 July 2010.

Track list

See also
 Bollywood films of 2010

References

External links
 

Hindi remakes of English films
2010s Hindi-language films
Films featuring songs by Pritam
2010 comedy films
Films scored by Sanjoy Chowdhury
Indian remakes of American films
2010 directorial debut films
2010 films
Indian comedy-drama films